An all-in-one computer or all-in-one PC (AIO) is a personal computer that integrates the system's internal components into the same case as the display, thus occupying a smaller footprint (with fewer cables) than desktops that incorporate a tower.

Advantages and disadvantages
Some advantages of the all-in-one computer compared to other form factors include being easier to set up, a reduced physical footprint, ease of transportation, and the option to interface with the computer via touchscreen (a now-common fixture on all-in-ones). Some disadvantages include generally being more expensive than desktop computers, a lack of customizability—most of the internal hardware such as the RAM and the SSD, especially in post-late-2010s machines, is soldered onto the system board—a lack of upgrade paths for the CPU, RAM, and technology of the display, and the difficulty of repair.

History

This form factor was popular during the early 1980s for personal computers intended for professional use such as the Commodore PET, the Osborne 1, the TRS-80 Model II, and the Datapoint 2200. Many manufacturers of home computers like Commodore and Atari included the computer's motherboard into the same enclosure as the keyboard; these systems were most often connected to a television set for display. Apple has manufactured several popular examples of all-in-one computers, such as the original Macintosh of the mid-1980s and the iMac G3 of the late 1990s and 2000s. By the mid 2000s, many all-in-one designs have used flat-panel displays (chiefly LCDs), and later models have incorporated touchscreen displays, allowing them to be used similarly to a mobile tablet.

Since the early 2000s, some all-in-one desktops, such as the iMac G4, have used laptop components in order to reduce the size of the system case. Like most laptops, some all-in-one desktop computers are characterized by an inability to customize or upgrade internal components, as the systems' cases do not provide convenient access to upgradable components, and faults in certain aspects of the hardware may require the entire computer to be replaced, regardless of the health of its remaining components. There have been exceptions to this; the monitor portion of HP's Z1 workstation can be angled flat, and opened like a vehicle hood for access to internal hardware.

See also
 2-in-1 PC
 Portable computer
 Internet appliance

References

 
Classes of computers
Personal computers